This is a list of football (soccer) stadiums in Cape Verde, ranked in descending order of capacity.comprehensive. The minimum capacity is 1,000. It includes:

 The stadiums of all clubs in the top two tiers of the Cape Verdean football league system as of the 2016–17 season (Cape Verdean Football Championships and the Regional Premier Divisions), with rankings within each league given.
 The stadiums of teams from Cape Verde which play in national leagues of other football associations, as of the 2016-17 season.

Existing stadiums

Old stadiums
Estadio 20 de Janeiro - Maio
Estadio Municipal Amílcar Cabral - Porto Novo, Santo Antão
Estadio do Espargos - Sal
Estadio de Sal Rei - Boa Vista
Campo de Tarrafal - Tarrafal de São Nicolau, São Nicolau

See also 
List of association football stadiums by capacity
List of African stadiums by capacity

References 

 
Cape Verde
Football in Cape Verde
Football stadiums